Oxalis melanosticta, the black-spotted wood sorrel, is a species of flowering plant in the family Oxalidaceae, native to the southwestern Cape Provinces of South Africa. Its cultivar 'Ken Aslet' has gained the Royal Horticultural Society's Award of Garden Merit.

References

melanosticta
Endemic flora of South Africa
Flora of the Cape Provinces
Plants described in 1860